Qiwllaqucha (Quechua qillwa, qiwlla, qiwiña gull, qucha lake, "gull lake", Hispanicized spelling Quiulacocha, Quiullacocha) is a lake in Peru located in the Lima Region, Yauyos Province, Tomas District.

References 

Lakes of Peru
Lakes of Lima Region